Social ecology may refer to:

 Social ecology (academic field), the study of relationships between people and their environment, often the interdependence of people, collectives and institutions
 Social ecology (Bookchin), a theory about the relationship between ecological and social issues, associated with Murray Bookchin
 Social ecological model, frameworks for depicting the conceptual interrelations between environmental and personal factors

See also
 Socioecology, the scientific study of how social structure and organization are influenced by an organism's environment

Social science disambiguation pages